The 2016 ICC World Twenty20 was the sixth ICC World Twenty20, and the first to be hosted by India. Sri Lanka were the defending champions, having won the 2014 edition. The following squads were chosen for the tournament. The player ages are as on 8 March 2016, the opening day of the tournament, and where a player plays for more than one team in Twenty20 cricket, only their domestic team is listed (for example: at the time, Jos Buttler played for Lancashire Lightning in the T20 Blast and Mumbai Indians in the Indian Premier League).

Afghanistan

Coach:  Inzamam-ul-Haq Former Pakistan Batsman and Captain

Australia
Australia announced their squad on 9 February 2016.

Coach:  Darren Lehmann

Bangladesh
Bangladesh announced their squad on 3 February 2016:

Coach:  Chandika Hathurusingha

England
England announced their squad on 10 February 2016:

Coach:  Trevor Bayliss

Hong Kong
Hong Kong announced their squad on 28 January 2016.

Coach:  Simon Cook

India
India announced their squad on 5 February 2016.

Team Director:  Ravi Shastri

Ireland
Ireland announced their squad on 8 February 2016.

Coach:  John Bracewell

Netherlands
The Netherlands announced their squad on 6 February 2016.

Coach:  Anton Roux

New Zealand
New Zealand announced their squad on 1 February 2016.

Coach:  Mike Hesson

Oman
Oman announced their squad on 13 February 2016:

Coach:  Duleep Mendis

Pakistan
Pakistan announced their squad on 10 February 2016:

Coach:  Waqar Younis

Scotland
Scotland announced their squad on 8 February 2016.

Coach:  Grant Bradburn

South Africa
South Africa announced their squad on 10 February 2016:

Coach:  Russell Domingo

Sri Lanka
Sri Lanka announced their squad on 18 February 2016:

Coach:  Graham Ford

West Indies
The West Indian squad was announced on 29 January 2016.

Coach:  Phil Simmons

Zimbabwe
Zimbabwe announced their squad on 14 February 2016:

Coach:  Dav Whatmore

Changes 
On 19 March, Taskin Ahmed and Arafat Sunny, members of the Bangladesh squad, were suspended from bowling in international cricket due to probable illegal bowling actions. They were replaced with Shuvagata Hom and Saqlain Sajib.

On 26 February, England's Liam Plunkett was named as the replacement for Steven Finn, who was ruled out with a calf strain.

Tom Cooper was added to the Netherlands squad on 25 February, 19 days after the squad was announced.

On 23 February, Babar Azam and Rumman Raees withdrew from the tournament due to injury. They were replaced in the Pakistan squad by Sharjeel Khan and Mohammad Sami. Khalid Latif was also added to Pakistan's squad in place of Iftikhar Ahmed. On 3 March, Ahmed Shehzad was also added to the squad in place of Khurram Manzoor.

Sri Lanka's squad was changed after the initial announcement. This new squad was named on 8 March 2016, where Jeffrey Vandersay and Niroshan Dickwella were replaced by Suranga Lakmal and Lahiru Thirimanne. Lasith Malinga stepped down from the captaincy due to his slow recovery from  an injury and Angelo Mathews was appointed as the captain. On 18 March Sri Lanka Cricket announced that Malinga was ruled out of the tournament after failing to sufficiently recover from his knee injury. Jeffrey Vandersay, who was withdrawn earlier from the original squad, was named as Malinga's replacement.

After the West Indies squad was announced, Kieron Pollard, Sunil Narine and Darren Bravo withdrew before the tournament started. Pollard was replaced by Carlos Brathwaite, while Ashley Nurse replaced Narine. Bravo's replacement in the squad is Johnson Charles. Lendl Simmons was ruled out of the tournament after suffering a back injury. He was replaced with Evin Lewis. Before the semi-finals, Andre Fletcher suffered a hamstring injury and was ruled out of the rest of the tournament. Lendl Simmons, who had recovered from his back injury was called in as a replacement.

Yuvraj Singh was ruled out before semi final. Manish Pandey was called to replaced him.

References

2016 ICC World Twenty20
Cricket squads
ICC Men's T20 World Cup squads